Fabio Maioni was an Italian swimmer. He competed in the men's 4000 metre freestyle event at the 1900 Summer Olympics.

References

External links
 

Year of birth missing
Year of death missing
Italian male swimmers
Olympic swimmers of Italy
Swimmers at the 1900 Summer Olympics
Swimmers from Milan
Italian male freestyle swimmers
Place of death missing